The Electoral Commission of Uganda, also Uganda Electoral Commission, is a constitutionally established organ of the Government of Uganda, whose mandate is to "organise and conduct regular, free and fair elections" in the country, in an efficient, professional and impartial manner.

Location
The Electoral Commission maintains its headquarters at 55 Jinja Road, in the Central Division of Kampala, the capital and  largest city in Uganda. The coordinates of the headquarters of the Uganda Electoral Commission are:0°19'00.0"N, 32°35'39.0"E (Latitude:0.316675; Longitude:32.594154).

History
The law establishing the electoral commission was promulgated in 1997. The first Electoral commission served from 1997 until 2002. The current commission came into office in 2016 for a seven-year term, renewable once only. This commission headed by Justice of the High Court, Justice Simon Mugenyi Byabakama,  replaces that which was headed by Engineer Badru Kiggundu that served two terms (2002–2009 and 2009–2016). Other commissioners include Hajjat Aisha Lubega (vice chairperson) and commissioners Peter Emorut, Steven Tashobya, Justine Ahabwe Mugabi, Nathaline Etomaru and Mustapha Ssebaggala Kigozi. During their first year in office, they organised and supervised by-elections. The first nationwide election that they are expected to organise is the election of the Local Council leaders. As of April 2018, those were being delayed by lack of sufficient funds.

Commissioners
The following are the current commissioners (2016–2022) The new team was sworn in on 17 January 2017.

 Simon Mugenyi Byabakama: Chairperson
 Hajjat Aisha Lubega: Deputy Chairperson
 Peter  Emorut: Commissioner 
 Justine Ahabwe Mugabi: Commissioner
 Stephen Tashobya: Commissioner
 Mustapha Ssebagala Kigozi: Commissioner
 Nathaline Etomaru:  Commissioner

Controversy 
The Electoral Commission has repeatedly been accused of not begin impartial. In the Presidential Elections of 2021 there were 409 polling stations with a 100% turnout, all of which were won by president Museveni. Election forms (so-called Declaration of Results) have been altered at the advantage of president Museveni in a way that the Electoral Commission has not been able to explain.

References

External links
Website of Electoral Commission of Uganda
 Staging an election in Uganda: Kiggundu’s third act - 2 March 2016

Government agencies of Uganda
Politics of Uganda
Law of Uganda
Uganda
1997 establishments in Uganda